A Country Collection is a compilation album by Anne Murray issued by Capitol Records in 1980. It is a collection of ten songs, nine of which were taken from albums released between 1978 and 1980, with one additional song, "Do You Think Of Me?", newly recorded for the album.

Unlike her then forthcoming Greatest Hits collection, which was composed mainly of Murray's chart hits, A Country Collection focused primarily on album cuts and lesser known material.  The album peaked at #73 on the Billboard 200 and #7 on the Top Country Albums chart. It sold approximately 100,000 copies in the United States.

Track listing

Chart performance

References

1980 greatest hits albums
Anne Murray compilation albums
Albums produced by Jim Ed Norman
Capitol Records compilation albums